Bedok North MRT station is an underground Mass Rapid Transit station on the Downtown line in the northern part of Bedok, Singapore, located along Bedok North Road, near the Pan Island Expressway flyover and the Bedok Town Park. It will serve a future integrated hospital in the area.

History

The station was first announced as Bedok Town Park station on 20 August 2010 when the 16 stations of the  Downtown Line Stage 3 (DTL3) from the River Valley (now Fort Canning) to Expo stations were unveiled. The line was expected to be completed in 2017. Construction of the station and the tunnels commenced in the second quarter that year and was targeted to be completed in 2017.

On 31 May 2017, the Land Transport Authority (LTA) announced that the station, together with the rest of DTL3, will be opened on 21 October that year. Passengers were offered a preview of the station along with the other Downtown Line 3 (DTL 3) stations at the DTL 3 Open House on 15 October.

References

External links

Railway stations in Singapore opened in 2017
Bedok
Mass Rapid Transit (Singapore) stations